USS Conquest is a name used more than once by the U.S. Navy:

 , a merchant ship Genesee Packet, was purchased 8 October 1812.
 , a coastal minesweeper placed in service 9 March 1942.
 , a minesweeper launched 20 May 1954.

References 
 

United States Navy ship names